MVRDV is a Rotterdam, Netherlands-based architecture and urban design practice founded in 1993. The name is an acronym for the founding members: Winy Maas, Jacob van Rijs, and Nathalie de Vries.

History
Maas and Van Rijs worked at OMA, De Vries at Mecanoo before starting MVRDV.

The trio studied architecture together at the Delft University of Technology, Netherlands and won the "Europan 2" competition with their project "Berlinvoids" in 1991 before founding MVRDV two years later.

The firm's first commission was the new offices for the public broadcasting corporation VPRO in Hilversum, the Netherlands (1993–1997). Other built works include the Wozoco housing in Amsterdam (1994–1997) and the Dutch Pavilion at the Hannover World Exhibition Expo 2000 (1997–2000). These were followed by a business park 'Flight Forum' in Eindhoven, Gemini Residence silo conversion in Copenhagen, the Silodam Housing complex in Amsterdam, the Matsudai Cultural Centre in Japan, Unterföhring office campus near Munich, the Lloyd Hotel in Amsterdam, an urban plan and housing in The Hague Ypenburg, the rooftop – housing extension Didden Village in Rotterdam, the cultural Centre De Effenaar in Eindhoven, the boutique shopping building Gyre in Tokyo, Veldhoven's Maxima Medical Centre and the iconic Mirador housing estate in Madrid. Recently completed projects include a public library in Spijkenisse, the Netherlands, a shopping center in Schijndel, the Netherlands, a bank headquarters in Oslo, Norway, and most recently a public market hall, combining housing and shopping into a monument arch, in Rotterdam.

Current projects in progress or on site include various housing projects in the Netherlands, China, France, India, the United Kingdom, the United States and other countries, a sustainable office building in Paris, a central business district in Shanghai, an office tower in Poznań, a museum of rock music and a community cultural centre in Roskilde and Frederiksberg respectively, large scale urban masterplans in Oslo, Bordeaux and Caen, an entire new eco-city in Logrono, Spain, a structural development vision for Dutch New Town Almere, the masterplan for the Floriade (Netherlands) Horticultural Expo 2022, also in Almere, and a research masterplan into the future of greater Paris which was commissioned by French president Nicolas Sarkozy and the mayor of Paris Bertrand Delanoë.

MRVDV also maintains a research-oriented project called "The Why Factory", which is described by them as an "independent think-tank and research institute". It is run together with the Delft University of Technology.

Influences
In an interview, Winy Maas names Rem Koolhaas as one of the most important people that he has worked with and for. He describes parts of his work as intellectual responses to Koolhaas questions. OMA and MVRDV share a couple of common features, starting with the positioning of the architect in their draft process. Projects are treated as collaborative efforts and the architect becomes a catalyst."If the notion of creation is still present in their discourse, it is more than a co-creation or synergie between all the parties than as the exclusive vision or synthesis of an architect." The general concept of densification in the urban context is a topic Rem Koolhaas focuses heavily on in his book "Delirious New York", which also constitutes a major part of MVRDV's research for instance in their publication "FARMAX".Through these conceptual overlaps the projects of the two offices show in some cases even strong formal accordances, as in the case of the VPRO Building and the Educatorium.

Natalie de Vries was the project leader for one of Mecanoo´s projects at the time, where she could gain experience of the real architecture practise. Another factor that supported the founding of MVRDV was the general building situation in the Netherlands that was supportive of young architects. This led to all three receiving a grant from the Dutch government which helped them start their own office.

Architectural language
The variety of design choices shows that MVRDV is not to develop a specific style of architecture, but to provide and develop different methods in designing architecture and urban space. Projects are developed by interdisciplinary teams that test different possibilities rather than designing "top-down". Over the years, this strategy led to the development of an architectural language that helps in explaining design choices to others.

In the exhibition "Architecture speaks" – The Language of MVRDV, the office presents four of the words used in the language that describes their work. The exhibition was shown in the "aut", the centre for architecture in Tyrol, in Innsbruck, Austria and was curated by Natalie de Vries.

 "stack": This refers to the ever growing demand in space as well as the approach to stack and connect functions vertically, to create a three-dimensional space. This method came into use for the "Berlinvoids" design, where the office saw an opportunity to renew the standard way to deal with densification.
 "pixel": The term "pixel" deals with the boundaries of space and provides the smallest unit in an agglomeration of units. It was initially developed as a measuring tool for the offices software "The Function mixer" and transformed into a flexible form that is adapted to the needs of its function.
 "village": With the manifestation of the term village, MVRDV takes the next step into not only wanting to develop the immediate building but also the context. They use the "village" to be an example for ideal homes and neighbourhoods that can work as a basis for "healthy community-making"(DeVries, 2019).
 "activator": Spaces that engage social interaction are referred to as "activators". These projects provide structures that exceed habitable use, being descriptive of the social interaction process rather than the formalistic character of the structure itself.

Projects (selection)

Villa VPRO, Hilversum, Netherlands (1993–1997) 
Main article: Villa VPRO

Silodam Housing complex, Amsterdam (1995–2003) 
The Silodam Housing complex unites 157 units that are used for housing, offices and work spaces, as well as room for commercial and overall public use. The complex is grouped into four to eight units from the same house type that can be recognised in the facade. These housing types come from four different clients: a housing developer, a housing corporation, a developer of workspaces and the city of Amsterdam. From the outside, the complex resembles a containership. These containers also provide different types of housing for different types of (financial) background. To match these varieties, the depth and height of the blocks can vary from 5–15 meters in width as well as 2,80m to 3,60m in height. To strengthen the symbolic image of a containership, there is also a harbour underneath the complex, that connects the different "neighbourhoods".

Dutch Pavilion at the Hannover World Exhibition Expo 2000 (1997–2000) 
The Dutch Pavilion is one of the buildings that helped the office to international recognition. The 50m high structure does not have a facade, but consists of several floor levels stacked on top of each other. By taking the assigned floor area for the pavilion and stacking said space, MVRDV wanted to contribute to the dutch history of taking land from the sea and eventually giving it back by expanding vertically. Through dividing and stacking the floorspace, energy can be saved, existing nature can be preserved and there is more space for cultural manifestations. As of July 2020 there are plans to revisit the project and convert it into an office building as well as adding student housing and parking to the structure.

Hagen Island, Ypenburg, Netherlands (2000–2003) 
The Hagen Island is a part of the bigger residential housing project "Ypenburg" in Ypenburg, outside the borders of Den Haag. Being a "randstad", the city of Ypenburg consists of monocultural suburban structures. The whole area consists of 37 different "macroblocks". Hagen Island is a pedestrian island with only one motorized street circling the island. The plots are divided into four rows of houses, that are broken up from linearity. This generates a series of exterior spaces that differ in appearance and use. The whole area is connected through small paths that access the houses as well as two communal spaces in the middle of the island. The 119 units are designed very simply in six different facade types and do not have a cellar, which is a result of the tight budget, as well as giving the future inhabitants space to reinterpret their homes. The houses are intentionally built void of detail to reduce cost and also strengthen the archetypical appearance. With this design, the office did not want architecture to be the main focus, but the spaces in between that define the neighbourhood.The whole project was also an answer to the ideal approach of homeowning and planned out to be almost a caricature of said ideal.

Market Hall, Rotterdam, Netherlands (2009–2014) 
The Market Hall in Rotterdam is a mixed-use building that unites privately developed apartments with a public space. The public space houses a central market hall during the day and a series of restaurants on the lower levels in the evening as well as further public uses as shops and parking. The inner facade of the Market Hall is covered with a large mural covering the entire inner space. The artwork "Cornucopia" by Arno Coenen and Iris Roskam shows large images of food products that reference the Dutch still-image paintings of the 17th century. To protect the inner space of the arch from the weather, but still provide the open character the architects intended, the facade is made of single-glazed glass panels that form a cable-net facade, which is the largest of its kind in Europe.

Traumhaus Funari, Mannheim, Germany (2015–?) 
In cooperation with the prefabricated house company "Traumhaus", MVRDV developed a village structure on the site of the former US army barracks Benjamin Franklin. Their approach in this design is to redefine suburban living. The fully pedestrianised village is pre-planned out of a catalogue of housing and garden modules that match a certain resident type. This is meant to cause diversity and avoid gentrification of the area. Out of the 127 pre-planned houses, potential buyers can choose one that matches their lifestyle and needs.

Criticism 
Since the office made its way to be a major player in the architectural industry, critical voices started to rise as well. One of the claims could be described as an adaptation to the contemporary commercial trends. According to Mark Minkjan's article the renderings of the "Valley", a project located in an emerging business district of Amsterdam, are deceptive commercial images that palliate the future realised building. Furthermore, he accuses the office of greenwashing, by the unrealistic illustration of rooftop gardens and terraces, which is used as a coverup of the  emissions of the building construction. Generally speaking he claims that architects nowadays serve oftentimes as makeup artists of sales pitches, or producers of visual pleasing "Eye-Candies'' and gives an example of these developments by MVRDV’s architectural representation of the "Valley".

MVRDV's design of the Marble Arch Mound has been strongly criticised  and said to be pointless, a massive waste of time and material, a pile of rubble, and London's worst attraction.

Research

The Why Factory 
The Why Factory is a co operational research institute of the Delft University led by professor Winy Maas. Its research revolves around analyzing urban developments and providing possible future scenarios for future cities and societies. Particular focus is put on opening up the discourse to the public through exhibitions, workshops, publications and panel discussions. The 2007 founded Institute provides an experimental outlook on the urban landscape of the future by exploring imaginary narratives and their interlinked new social contexts. To develop scenarios further, the Why Factory also uses computational design tools for analyzing and generating these concepts.

This List shows the research projects of MVRDV.

 Gwangju Folly
 Crystal Houses
 Almere Oosterworld
 Grand Paris
 Almere 2030
 Airbus UAM
 Pampus Harbour
 North Sea Wind Park
 Pig City
 The NEXT ITMO
 Oslo Le Grand
 Stadt Land Schweiz
 Skycar City
 Metacity/Datatown
 Myst Light Fixture
 The Why Factory
 Architecture Speaks: The Language of MVRDV
 Infinity Kitchen
 Vertical Village IBA
 Vertical Village Seoul
 House of Clothing
 NL28 Olympic Fire
 Freeland @ the Biennale
 Vertical City Taipei
 Bi-City Biennale 2017
 MVRDV Haus Berlin
 Porous City Lego Towers
 The Hungry Box
 MVRDVH20
 China Hills

Publications 
 FARMAX (010 Publishers, Rotterdam, 1999)
 Metacity/Datatown (010 Publishers, Rotterdam, 1999)
 Reading MVRDV (NAi Publishers, Rotterdam, 2003)
 Spacefighter The evolutionary city game (Actar, Barcelona, 2005)
 KM3 EXCURSIONS ON CAPACITIES (Actar, Barcelona, 2006)
 Skycar City (Actar, Barcelona, 2008)
MVRDV Agendas on Urbanism (Equal Books, Seoul, 2012)
MVRDV Buildings (010 Publishers, Rotterdam, 2013)
The Glass Farm – Biography of a Building (010 Publishers, Rotterdam, 2013)
Book Mountain – Biography of a Building (010 Publishers, Rotterdam, 2013)

Further reading
Farmax: Excursions on Density. 010 Publishers, 2006. 
KM3: Excursions on Capacities. Actar, 1999. 
Reading MVRDV. NAi Publishers, 2003. 
Gonzalo Herrero Delicado. Mirador Building, Madrid, Spain: MVRDV and Blanca Lleó 2005. – Galinsky, 2006
Frey, Darcy "Crowded House" – The New York Times Magazine, June 8, 2008

References

External links 
 
Archicentral.com: MVRDV projects
Danda.be: MVRDV projects photo gallery
Archello.com: MVRDV publications

Architecture firms of the Netherlands
Companies based in Rotterdam
Design companies established in 1993
1993 establishments in the Netherlands